This is a list of ships named Oronsay:
  (renamed Hainaut after 1900) 2,070 GRT steamship wrecked off Skyros in 1911
  3,761 GRT cargo ship, torpedoed off Malta in 1916
  Orient Line liner and troopship torpedoed off Liberia in 1942
  Orient Line (later P&O) liner and cruise ship, broken-up in 1975

See also
 Oronsay (disambiguation)
 List of islands called Oronsay

References

Ship names